Quinto Antonio Martini (August 15, 1908 – July 27, 1975) was a Canadian politician and real estate broker, born in Hamilton, Ontario.

Martini was born in Hamilton on August 15, 1908, to Benito Martini and Palmina Rossi, both of whom were Italian. He attended St Ann's School in Hamilton, and then Hamilton Technical School. On June 25, 1931, he married Lucy Caiazzo, daughter of a real-estate broker.

He was elected Member of Parliament for Hamilton East in 1957, and became the first Italian Canadian elected to parliament he lost his seat in 1962.

References

External links

1908 births
1975 deaths
Canadian people of Italian descent
Members of the House of Commons of Canada from Ontario
Politicians from Hamilton, Ontario
Progressive Conservative Party of Canada MPs